is a Japanese multi-national business conglomerate with headquarters in Tokyo. Daiwa's primary interests are in the resources and energy business in the United States and Australia; and the company is also involved in the food business.

History
Daiwa was started in 1947 as a manufacturer of industrial use machine sewing thread and twisted yarns. The company subsequently diversified.

Following the 2011 Tohoku earthquake and tsunami, the series of Fukushima I nuclear accidents included the discovery of a roughly 20 cm crack in a concrete-lined basin behind the No. 2 reactor's turbine building. Daiwa provided a water-gel polymer mix which was introduced into the basin in an attempt to plug the leak; but the attempt was initially unsuccessful.

References

External links 
 IB Daiwa website in Japanese

Conglomerate companies established in 1947
Japanese companies established in 1947
Holding companies of Japan
Holding companies established in 1947